St. Lawrence F.C. is a football club based on the Channel Island of Jersey, United Kingdom. They are affiliated to the Jersey Football Association and play in the Jersey Football Combination Premiership.

References

External links
Official website

Football clubs in Jersey